The Air Transport Authority of the Democratic Republic of Congo (French: Régie des Voies Aériennes de la République Démocratique du Congo) (RVA) is the air transportation board of the Democratic Republic of the Congo. Its head office is at the intersection of N'Dolo Airport and Avenue Kabasele Tshiamala, in the Ndolo neighbourhood of the Barumbu commune of Kinshasa. The agency operates 54 airports in the DRC.

See also
 Ministry of Transport and Channels of Communication

References

External links

 Régie des Voies Aériennes (RVA.CD) 
 Régie des Voies Aériennes (RVA-RDC.COM) 

Democratic Republic of the Congo
Government of the Democratic Republic of the Congo
Transport organisations based in the Democratic Republic of the Congo